Maakri is a subdistrict in the district of Kesklinn (Midtown), Tallinn, the capital of Estonia. It has a population of 1,099. In the last decade Maakri has developed into the main business centre of Tallinn. Many high-rise buildings have been built into the area during this period.

History 
Maakri subdistrict is named after the Macker family, who owned a painting workshop located at Maakri 23.

The latter part of the 19th century saw Maakri become home to many shops and industrial factories, as well as to the first Great Synagogue of Tallinn, which was built in 1884 and destroyed in the 1944 March bombing. Maakri was also home to the Tallinn Paper Factory, which was located on the site of the current Stockmann department store, and to Theodor Grünwald's leather and footwear factory, which today has been redeveloped as Maakri Kvartal.

After the Estonian Restoration of independence, many high-rise buildings have been built in the Maakri area. In 1999, the first high-rise was completed - the 94-metre tall SEB Pank headquarters.

Skyscrapers and high-rises 
Maakri is home to the majority of the tallest buildings in Tallinn.

Furthermore, a number of high-rise buildings such as Hotel Olümpia (84 m), City Plaza (78 m), Hotel Viru (74 m) and Novira Plaza (53 m) are situated in the close proximity to the Maakri subdistrict, meaning together they form a consistent skyline of the Tallinn city centre.

The future of Maakri sees the density of high-rise buildings increase, as a number of proposed projects are in development, such as a 30-floor Lauteri 3 development by EBS, a 36-floor Maakri 29 development by the Estonian Evangelical Lutheran Church and a cluster of high-rise buildings planned by Capital Mill on the site of the area between Lennuki and Maakri streets.

Gallery

References

Subdistricts of Tallinn
Kesklinn, Tallinn
Central business districts